is a retired Japanese professional infielder.

External links

Living people
1979 births
Baseball people from Hiroshima Prefecture
Japanese baseball players
Komazawa University alumni
Nippon Professional Baseball infielders
Hokkaido Nippon-Ham Fighters players
Yokohama BayStars players
Tohoku Rakuten Golden Eagles players
Japanese baseball coaches
Nippon Professional Baseball coaches